The Chilean flamingo (Phoenicopterus chilensis) is a species of large flamingo at  closely related to the American flamingo and the greater flamingo, with which it was sometimes considered conspecific. The species is listed as near threatened by the IUCN.

It breeds in South America from Ecuador and Peru to Chile and Argentina and east to Brazil; it has been introduced into the Netherlands. Like all flamingos, it lays a single chalky-white egg on a mud mound. 

These flamingos are mainly restricted to salt lagoons and soda lakes but these areas are vulnerable to habitat loss and water pollution.

Description

The plumage is pinker than the slightly larger greater flamingo, but less so than the Caribbean flamingo. It can be differentiated from these species by its grayish legs with pink joints (tibiotarsal articulation), and also by the larger amount of black on the bill (more than half). Young chicks may have no sign of pink coloring whatsoever, but instead remain gray or peach.

Diet
The Chilean flamingo's bill is equipped with comb-like structures that enable it to filter food—mainly algae and plankton—from the water of the coastal mudflats, estuaries, lagoons, and salt lakes where it lives.

Breeding
Chilean flamingos live in large flocks in the wild and require crowded conditions to stimulate breeding. During breeding season, males and females display a variety of behaviors to attract mates, including head flagging—swiveling their heads from side-to-side in tandem—and wing salutes, where the wings are repeatedly opened and closed. Flamingos in general have a poor record of successful breeding because they will delay reproduction until the environmental conditions are favorable for breeding. 

Males and females co-operate in building a pillar-shaped mud nest, and both incubate the egg laid by the female. Both parents also take turns incubating the egg. Upon hatching, the chicks have gray plumage; they do not gain the typical pink adult coloration for 2–3 years. Both male and female flamingos can produce a nutritious fluid from glands in their crop to feed their young. Due to their diet, this crop milk is crimson in color.

In captivity
The first flamingo hatched in a European zoo was a Chilean flamingo at Zoo Basel (Switzerland) in 1958.

In 1988, a Chilean flamingo that lived in the Tracy Aviary in Salt Lake City, Utah, had mistakenly not received his routine wing clipping. The flamingo escaped, and became a local legend in the greater Salt Lake area known as Pink Floyd the Flamingo. Pink Floyd came to Utah in the winters to eat the brine shrimp that live in the Great Salt Lake, and flew north to Idaho and Montana in the spring and summer. Pink Floyd became a popular tourist attraction and local icon until his disappearance and presumed death after he flew north to Idaho one spring in 2005 and was never seen again.

Since there is such a decline in this species, breeding programs have been implemented in zoos to offset the decline of the wild stock numbers.

See also
Andean flamingo

References

External links

Flamingo Resource Centre -  a collection of resources and information related to flamingos

Chilean flamingo
Chilean flamingo
Chilean flamingo
Birds of the Puna grassland
Birds of Argentina
Birds of Peru
Birds of Uruguay
Near threatened animals
Near threatened biota of South America
Chilean flamingo